The Japan women's national under-20 volleyball team represents Japan in women's under-20 volleyball events, it is controlled and managed by the Japanese Volleyball Association that is a member of Asian volleyball body Asian Volleyball Confederation (AVC) and the international volleyball body government the Fédération Internationale de Volleyball (FIVB).

Results

FIVB U20 World Championship
 Champions   Runners up   Third place   Fourth place

Team

Current squad

The following is the Japanese roster for the 2019 FIVB Volleyball Women's U20 World Championship.

Head coach: Noboru Aihara

Notable players

References

External links
Official website
FIVB profile

 

National women's under-20 volleyball teams
Volleyball in Japan
Volleyball